Michel Lacombe (born 1973 in Montréal, Québec) is a Canadian comic book artist.

Biography 
Born in Montréal in 1973, Michel Lacombe is the creator of the self-published comics One Bloody Year, a four-episode vampire romance. He illustrated several Star Wars comics and Warrior Nun Areala.

Michel Lacombe has illustrated a couple of issues of Dark Horse's Star Wars Tales and Star Wars: Empire comics and Green Lantern for DC Comics. He was once also active in animation. Currently working on The Punisher, he is also publishing a webcomic, Jesus Monkey Pants In Space.

Bibliography

Comics work includes:
 Star Wars: Empire #34: "In the Shadows of Their Fathers, Part 5"
 Lacombe illustrated the final installment of the five-part story arc. The story follows the character of Princess Leia as she embarks on a mission to rescue her father, Darth Vader, from a group of Rebel Alliance fighters.
 Star Wars: Rebellion #0: "Crossroads"
 Lacombe illustrated the one-shot prequel story. The story takes place between the events of the films Episode IV: A New Hope and Episode V: The Empire Strikes Back, and explores the character of Princess Leia as she tries to find a way to strike back against the Galactic Empire.
 Star Wars: Rebellion #3: "My Brother, My Enemy, Part 3"
 Lacombe illustrated the third installment of the four-part story arc. The story follows the character of Luke Skywalker as he tries to rescue his friend and fellow Rebel Alliance fighter, Deena Shan, from the clutches of the Empire.

See also 
 Bande dessinée
 Canadian comics
 Quebec comic strips

References 

 BDQ, Répertoire des publications de bandes dessinées au Québec des origines à nos jours, 1999, Michel Viau, éditions Mille-Îles, Laval ;
 Histoire de la bande dessinée au Québec, 2008, Mira Falardeau, VLB éditeur, Études québécoises collection, Montréal.

External links
 
 Michel Lacombe at Lambiek's Comiclopedia 
  

Living people
Canadian comics artists
1973 births
Canadian webcomic creators